The Ministry of Education and Culture is a  Cabinet position in the governments of several nations.  In some nations the Ministry of Education and the Ministry of Culture are separate departments; in others, the Ministry of Education and Culture also includes Arts, Science, Sports, etc.

The Ministry is politically responsible for education and promoting and protecting cultural expression.

Ministries of Education and Culture by country

 Ministry of Education and Culture (Cyprus)
 Ministry of Education and Culture (Finland)
 Ministry of Education and Culture (Israel)  A position that existed in 1949–1977, 1984–1990, 1992–1993, and is now the Ministry of Education.
 Ministry of Education and Culture (Mozambique)
 Ministry of Education and Culture (Philippines)  A position that existed from 1978-2001 and is now the Department of Education.
 Ministry of Education and Culture (Spain)  A position that existed from 1996-2000 and is now the Ministry of Education.
 Ministry of Education and Culture (Somalia)
 Ministry of Education and Culture (Tanzania)
 Ministry of Education and Culture (Uruguay)

Similarly named ministries in other countries

 Ministry of Education (Austria)
 Ministry of Education, Religious Affairs, Culture and Sports (Greece)
 Ministry of Education, Science and Culture (Iceland)
 Ministry of Education, Culture, Research, and Technology (Indonesia)
 Ministry of Education, Culture, Sports, Science and Technology, Japan
 Ministry of Education, Culture, Science, and Sports (Mongolia)
 Ministry of Education, Culture and Science (Netherlands)
 Ministry of Education, Research and Culture (Sweden)
 Ministry of Education, Sport and Culture (Zimbabwe)

See also 

 Right to science and culture
 Human rights
 Right to education
 Right to an adequate standard of living
 Welfare rights
 Right to education
 Economic, social and cultural rights
 Culture minister
 Cultural genocide
 Education minister
 Ministry of Culture and Tourism (disambiguation)

References